Olive Mary Bartle (1912-1994) was female swimmer who competed for England.

Diving career
Bartle won a bronze medal in the 4×110 yard freestyle relay at the 1934 British Empire Games in London.

Bartle was the southern counties 220 yards freestyle champion and represented England in the 1934 European Games in Magdeburg. She swam for the Kingston & Croydon Swimming Clubs.

Personal life
She married Ralph Banfield in 1937.

References

1912 births
1994 deaths
English female swimmers
Swimmers at the 1934 British Empire Games
Commonwealth Games medallists in swimming
Commonwealth Games bronze medallists for England
20th-century English women
Medallists at the 1934 British Empire Games